This is a list of the 133 National Historic Landmarks in the United States that are ships, shipwrecks, or shipyards.

Of the more than 2,500 NHLs, about 5 percent are ships, shipwrecks, or shipyards.

The NHL ships, shipwrecks, and shipyards are distributed across 31 states, the District of Columbia, Puerto Rico, and the U.S.-associated state of Micronesia.  Nineteen states have no ships among their NHLs.

Shipwrecks

Ships

States having no ships among their NHLs are: Arizona, Colorado, Delaware, Georgia, Idaho, Kansas, Minnesota, Montana, Nevada, New Jersey, New Mexico, North Dakota, Oklahoma, Rhode Island, South Dakota, Tennessee, Utah, West Virginia, and Wyoming.

Shipyards

Previous landmarks

See also
List of National Historic Landmarks by state

References